Krasny Vostok is a rural locality (a selo) in Korshunovsky Selsoviet of Mikhaylovsky District, Amur Oblast, Russia. The population was 81 as of 2018. There are 2 streets.

Geography 
Krasny Vostok is located on the right bank of the Zavitaya River, 15 km north of Poyarkovo (the district's administrative centre) by road. Cheremisino is the nearest rural locality.

References 

Rural localities in Mikhaylovsky District, Amur Oblast